WRRA (1290 AM) was a radio station formerly licensed to serve Frederiksted, U.S. Virgin Islands. The station was owned by Reef Broadcasting, Inc. It aired a Gospel music format.

Programming
In addition to its regular programming, this station aired the "dLife Diabetes Minute" health advisory program.

History

In 1969 an application was filed for a new station in Frederiksted, U.S. Virgin Islands, initially for 1090 kHz, which was modified to specify 1290 kHz in 1974. The station began broadcasting, as WRRA, in 1977.

Expanded Band assignment

On March 17, 1997 the Federal Communications Commission (FCC) announced that 88 stations had been given permission to move to newly available "Expanded Band" transmitting frequencies, ranging from 1610 to 1700 kHz, with WRRA authorized to move from 1280 to 1620 kHz.

An application for a construction permit for the expanded band station, also in Frederiksted, was filed on June 13, 1997, which was assigned the call letters WDHP on March 6, 1998. The FCC's initial policy was that both the original station and its expanded band counterpart could operate simultaneously for up to five years, after which owners would have to turn in one of the two licenses, depending on whether they preferred the new assignment or elected to remain on the original frequency, although this deadline was extended multiple times.

It was ultimately decided to end operations at the original station, and on February 8, 2011 the license for WRRA on 1290 kHz was cancelled.

References

External links
WRRA official website
FCC History Cards for WRRA (covering 1969-1980)

RRA
Radio stations established in 1977
Radio stations disestablished in 2011
2011 disestablishments in the United States Virgin Islands
RRA
Gospel radio stations in the United States
Saint Croix, U.S. Virgin Islands